Laurence John Keen  (born 1943), is a British archaeologist, historian, author and art expert. He served as the County Archaeologist for Dorset from 1975 to 1999 and was President of the British Archaeological Association from 1984 to 2004. In 2000 he was awarded the Order of the British Empire for 'services to archaeology'.

Early life
Born in London in 1943, he is the eldest son of the late John William Frederick Keen, an engineer, and Dorothy Ethel Keen, née French. He was educated at Kilburn Grammar School, St John's College York (CertEd, Music), the Institute of Archaeology (PGDip, European Archaeology, Gordon Childe Memorial Prize), and University College London (MPhil, Archaeology).

Career
He was the Director of the Southampton Archaeological Research Committee before being awarded the post of County Archaeologist for Dorset in 1975. Since then he has served on numerous national and international archaeological committees including the St George's Chapel Fabric Advisory Committee, Windsor Castle, for which he was chair from 1999 to 2004, the Exeter Cathedral Fabric Advisory Committee, for which he is currently chair, and the Gloucester Cathedral Fabric Advisory Committee.

He joined the British Archaeological Association in 1968 and was elected President in 1984, serving in this capacity until 2004.

He is currently the longest serving Board member and Trustee of Oxford Archaeology.

He is also a Fellow of the Royal Historical Society and the Society of Antiquaries.

Selected excavations
 Wardour Castle. Wiltshire, United Kingdom
 Blackfriars, Gloucester, United Kingdom
 Kingswood Abbey, Gloustershire, United Kingdom
 Tattershall College, Lincolnshire, United Kingdom
 Mount Grace Priory, Yorkshire, United Kingdom
 Beeston Castle, Cheshire, United Kingdom
 Prudhoe Castle, Northumberland, United Kingdom
 Sherborne Abbey, Dorset, United Kingdom

Selected publications
 Historic Landscape of The Weld Estate Dorset, (Editor), 1987
 William Barnes: the Somerset engravings, co-authored with Charlotte Lindgren, 1989
 Beeston Castle, Cheshire: A report on the excavations 1968-1985, co-authored with Peter Hough, 1993
 "Almost the richest city": Bristol in the Middle Ages, (Editor), 1997
 Windsor: medieval archaeology, art and architecture of the Thames Valley, co-authored with Eileen Scarff, 2002

References

1943 births
British archaeologists
Living people
Alumni of University College London
Officers of the Order of the British Empire
Fellows of the Society of Antiquaries of London
Fellows of the Royal Historical Society